Hasanabad-e Sofla (also Romanized as Ḩasanābād-e Soflá) is a village in Dashtab Rural District, in the Central District of Baft County, Kerman Province, Iran. At the 2006 census, its population was 25, in 4 families.

References 

Populated places in Baft County